Limitless is the second full-length album by the Italian modern melodic metal band Temperance. It was released via Scarlet Records on 31 March 2015.

Track listing

Personnel
Temperance
Giulio Capone – drums, keyboards
Sandro Capone – guitars, vocals (backing)
Chiara Tricarico – vocals (female)
Luca Negro – bass
Marco Pastorino – guitars (lead), vocals (backing), vocals (harsh)
Guest/session
Aymen Ksuori – vocals (growls & screams)
Crew
Simone Mularoni – mixing, mastering
Gustavo Sazes – artwork

Music videos
"Save Me"

References

Temperance (Italian band) albums
2015 albums
Scarlet Records albums